Green Valley is an unincorporated community in Fairview Township, Lyon County, Minnesota, United States.

The community is located between the cities of Marshall and Cottonwood near the junction of Minnesota State Highway 23 (MN 23) and Lyon County State-Aid Highway 8.

History
Green Valley was platted in 1888, and named for its location in the green valley of the Redwood River. A post office was established in Green Valley in 1889, and remained in operation until 1964.

References

 Rand McNally Road Atlas – 2007 edition – Minnesota entry
 Official State of Minnesota Highway Map – 2013/2014 edition

Unincorporated communities in Minnesota
Unincorporated communities in Lyon County, Minnesota